is a Japanese animation studio founded in October 2014 by Production I.G holding company IG Port.

Establishment
In 2014, IG Port announced it was forming a new animation studio named SIGNAL.MD. Production I.G board member Katsuji Morishita was appointed as president of the company.

Works

TV series
Tantei Team KZ's Jiken Note (2015–2016)
Atom: The Beginning (2017, co-animated with OLM and Production I.G)
Recovery of an MMO Junkie (2017)
Hashiri Tsuzukete Yokattatte. (2018)
FLCL Progressive (2018, episode 5)
Kedama no Gonjirō (2020, co-animated with OLM and Wit Studio; joined halfway)
Dragon Goes House-Hunting (2021)
Mars Red (2021)
Platinum End (2021–2022)
The Fire Hunter (2023)
Kizuna no Allele (2023, co-animated with Wit Studio)

OVAs
Yuuna and the Haunted Hot Springs (2020)

Films
Colorful Ninja Iromaki (2016)
Cyborg 009: Call of Justice (2016, co-animated with OLM)
Napping Princess (2017)
Birthday Wonderland (2019)
Kimi dake ni Motetainda (2019)
Fate/Grand Order - Divine Realm of the Round Table: Camelot ~ Wandering; Agaterám ~ (2020, animation production for first film)
Words Bubble Up Like Soda Pop (2021, co-animated with Sublimation)
Deemo: Memorial Keys (2022, co-animated with Production I.G)

References

External links
  
 

 
IG Port
Japanese animation studios
Japanese companies established in 2014
Mass media companies established in 2014